Acrolepiopsis marcidella is a moth of the family Acrolepiidae. It is found in Great Britain, France, Spain, Portugal, Switzerland, Italy, Croatia and Bulgaria.

The wingspan is 13–15 mm. Adults are on wing in June and July.

The larvae feed on butcher's broom (Ruscus aculeatus), mining the fruit.

References

Acrolepiidae
Moths described in 1850
Moths of Europe
Taxa named by John Curtis